John Marshall Grady (born 1950s) is an American sociologist and professor of sociology at Wheaton College, known for his seminal work in the field of visual sociology.

Education 
Grady earned an A.B. in English and Asian studies from Boston College, an A.M. in anthropology from Yale University, and a Ph.D. in sociology from Brandeis University.

Career 
After earning his PhD, Grady was appointed professor of sociology at Wheaton College. He also served as president of the International Visual Sociology Association (IVSA). His research interests focuses on social organization in daily life and the "use of visual imagery in social research and analysis; and making documentary films."

Selected publications 
 Grady, John. "The visual essay and sociology 1." Visual Studies 6.2 (1991): 23-38.
 Grady, John. "The scope of visual sociology." Visual Studies, 11.2 (1996): 10-24.
 Grady, John. "Becoming a visual sociologist." Sociological Imagination 38.1/2 (2001): 83-119.
 Grady, John. "Edward Tufte and the promise of a visual social science." Visual cultures of science: Rethinking representational practices in knowledge building and science communication (2006): 222-65.
 Grady, John. "Visual sociology." 21st century sociology: A reference handbook (2007): 63-70.
 Grady, John. "Visual research at the crossroads." Forum Qualitative Sozialforschung/Forum: Qualitative Social Research. Vol. 9. No. 3. 2008.

References 

1950s births
Living people
American sociologists
Morrissey College of Arts & Sciences alumni
Yale Graduate School of Arts and Sciences alumni
Brandeis University alumni
Wheaton College faculty